SuperCupNI, formerly called the  Northern Ireland Youth Soccer Tournament and the Dale Farm Milk Cup, is an international youth football tournament held annually in Northern Ireland. The cup matches are mainly played in the North Coast area of Northern Ireland, with matches taking place in the towns of Portrush, Portstewart, Castlerock, Limavady, Coleraine, Ballymoney, Ballymena and Broughshane. Mitre are the Official Ball Sponsor of the SuperCup with a specially designed Pro Max ball being used.

History 

The Northern Ireland Youth Soccer Tournament began in 1983 with sixteen teams participating at an Under 16 (Premier) level. Motherwell from Scotland were the first winners. It was founded by Jim Weir, Victor Leonard, George Logan and Bertie Peacock, one of the most famous football players from the region.

The competition was extended in 1985 when an extra age group, the Under 14 (Junior) section was introduced and again the first champions were from Scotland, as Rangers won the Northern Ireland Youth Soccer Tournament at that age level. The competition at both levels has grown in size and stature over the years, with teams increasingly travelling from all continents to compete. The Under 19 (Elite) section was introduced in 1995 with the Welsh finishing the tournament as winners. Traditionally, the finals are played at the Coleraine Showgrounds on the Friday evening.

Internationally capped footballers have taken part in the Northern Ireland Youth Soccer Tournament, such as Charlie Davies, Jonathan Spector, Paul Scholes, and Wayne Rooney have all competed at some level. In the 2002 FIFA World Cup there were 30 Northern Ireland Youth Soccer Tournament veterans playing.

To celebrate the competition's silver jubilee, a friendly match took place between Northern Ireland and four-time junior section winners Everton at the Coleraine Showgrounds on 14 July 2007. Everton won the tie 2–0.

One of the key parts to the Northern Ireland Youth Soccer Tournament is the inclusion of six representative teams from each county of Northern Ireland – Antrim, Armagh, Londonderry, Down, Fermanagh and Tyrone. This system allows young players from across the province to compete against some of the best in the world at their age group.

In October 2013, the Northern Ireland Youth Soccer Tournament organising committee and lead sponsors Dairy Council released a joint statement stating that the long-term sponsors Dairy Council would be withdrawing sponsorship.

In February 2014, the organisers announced that competition would be sponsored by Belfast-based company Dale Farm and that the competition would be known as the Dale Farm Milk Cup for sponsorship reasons. From 2016 it has been known as the Super Cup NI.

Winners

Notable players

 Danny Murphy (Crewe Alexandra) 1993
 Juan Agudelo (United States)
 Jozy Altidore (United States)
 Dean Ashton (Crewe Alexandra) 1997 (U14), 2000 (U19)
 Nicky Barmby (Tottenham Hotspur)
 Joey Barton (Everton) 1997 (U14)
 Craig Bellamy (Norwich City)
 Kris Boyd (Kilmarnock)
 Wes Brown (Manchester United) 1994 (U14), 1996 (U16)
 Sergio Busquets (Barcelona)
 Nicky Butt (Manchester United) 1991
 Michael Carrick (West Ham United) 1995 (U14)
 Michael Chopra (Newcastle United) 1997, 1998 (U14), 1999 (U16)
 Joe Cole (West Ham) 1995, 1996 (U14), 1998 (U16)
 Stephen Craigan (County Down) 2001 (U16), (Northern Ireland) 2003 (U19) 
 Peter Crouch (Tottenham Hotspur) 1997 (U16)
 Jermain Defoe (Charlton Athletic) 1997 (U14)
 Damien Duff (Blackburn Rovers) 1994, 1995 (U16)
 Calum Elliot (Heart of Midlothian) 2002 (U14), 2004 (U16)
 Jonny Evans (County Antrim) 2002 (U14), (Manchester United) 2004 (U16) 
 Shane Ferguson (Northern Ireland)
 Mikael Forssell (HJK Helsinki) 1997 (U16)
 Darron Gibson (County Londonderry) 2002 (U14), (Manchester United) 2004 (U16) 
 Ryan Giggs (Manchester United) 1991
 Keith Gillespie (Manchester United) 1991
 Owen Hargreaves (Bayern Munich 1997 (U16), (Wales) 1998 (U19)
 Angelo Henriquez (Chile)
 Humberto Suazo (Chile) 2000 (Elite)
 Tony Hibbert (Everton) 1995 (U14)
 Sean Sullivan (Malta National Team)
 Thomas Hitzlsperger (Bayern Munich)
 Aaron Hughes (Northern Ireland) 1996, 1997 (U19)
 Mats Hummels (Bayern Munich)
 Phil Jagielka (Everton) 1997 (U14)
 Francis Jeffers (Everton) 1995 (U14)
 Jeffren (Barcelona)
 Ledley King (Tottenham Hotspur) 1996, 1997 (U16)
 Kyle Lafferty (County Fermanagh) 2001, 2002, (U14), (Northern Ireland) 2003 (U16) 
 Federico Macheda (Manchester United)
 Steve McManaman (Liverpool) 1988
 Stephen McManus (Everton) 1997 (U14)
 James Milner (Leeds United) 2001, 2002, 2003 (U16)
 Juan Azuara (México) (2001)
 Ryo Miyaichi (Japan)
 Gary Neville (Manchester United)
 Leon Osman (Everton) 1995 (U14)
 Danny Pugh (Manchester United) 1997 (U14), 1999 (U16)
 Diego Reyes (Mexico)
 Kieran Richardson (West Ham United), 1997, 1998, 1999, (U14), (Manchester United) 2000, 2001 (U16) 
 Wayne Rooney (Everton)
 Robbie Savage (Manchester United)
 Paul Scholes (Manchester United) 1991
 Jonathan Spector (Manchester United, United States)
 Michael Tonge (Manchester United)
 Michael Turner (Charlton Athletic)
 James Vaughan (Everton)
 Danny Welbeck (Manchester United)
 Steven Davis (Northern Ireland) 2003, 2004 (U19)
 Andy Little (County Fermanagh), 2003, 2004 (U14), (Northern Ireland) 2007 (U19)
 Dean Shiels (West Ham United), 2000 (U14), (Northern Ireland) 2003 (U19) 
 Andy Kirk(Northern Ireland) 1996, 1997 (U19)
 David Healy (Northern Ireland) 1996, 1997 (U19)
 Chris Brunt (Northern Ireland) 2003 (U19)
 Cammy Bell (Kilmarnock) 2002, 2003 (U16)
 Sone Aluko (Birmingham City) 2003 (U14)
 Shaun Maloney (Scotland) 2001, 2002 (U19)
 Steven Naismith (Kilmarnock) 2002 (U16)
 Lee Wallace (Heart of Midlothian) 2002 (U14)
 Alan Mannus (Northern Ireland) 1998 (U16), 2000, 2001 (U19)
 Chris Baird (Northern Ireland) 2000, 2001 (U19)
 Allan McGregor (Scotland) 2001 (U19)
 Warren Feeney (Northern Ireland) 1997 (U16), 1998, 1999 (U19)	
 Ivan Sproule (County Tyrone) 1997 (U16)
 Roy Carroll (Northern Ireland) 1995 (U19)
 Charlie Miller (Rangers) 1992 (U16)
 Barry Ferguson (Rangers) 1992 (U14)
 Paddy McCourt (County Londonderry) 2000 (U16), (Northern Ireland) 2002 (U19) 
 Anton Ferdinand (West Ham United) 1998, 1999, 2000 (U14)
 Marcus Rashford (Manchester United) 2014 (U19)
 Mason Greenwood (Manchester United) 2014 (U13)

Media coverage
Since 2005 the Northern Ireland Youth Soccer Tournament has been broadcast on BBC Northern Ireland, taking over from UTV. This has led to much more media coverage as matches from Finals Night are broadcast on BBC Two Northern Ireland.  Usually these are from the Premier and Elite section featuring highlights of the junior game which happens earlier in the afternoon.  Some Northern Ireland Youth Soccer Tournament matches are broadcast on BBC Two NI, made available to the rest of the UK via BBCi and the BBC Sport website and some other Milk Cup matches are broadcast online. The coverage is usually hosted by Stephen Watson, with commentary by BBC commentators such as Jackie Fullerton, Michael McNamee, Paul Gilmour, Joel Taggart, Grant Cameron and punditry by John O'Neill, Gerry Armstrong and Oran Kearney.

See also
List of football (soccer) competitions

References

External links
 

 
International association football competitions hosted by Northern Ireland
Youth football competitions
Youth association football in Northern Ireland